Nude Fear is a 1998 Hong Kong psychological horror-thriller film directed by Alan Mak, starring Kathy Chow as a homicide detective pursuing a recently resurfaced serial killer who raped and killed her mother 23 years before. The film is Mak's directorial debut.

Plot
Joyce Chan Ching-yee (Kathy Chow), a 28-year-old superintendent of the Homicide Bureau. While investigating a horrific rape-murder, she immediately recognises the killer's modus operandi — it's the same one used by the man who murdered her mother 23 years before. Chan's investigation leads to the capture of Lee Chun-min (Sam Lee), who confesses to the murder of Chan's mother and several other women. Lee was arrested years before, but was released without a trial. As Lee is only 23, Chan is convinced an older serial killer is still on the loose, but the investigation come to an abrupt halt when Lee kills himself.

A confused young girl (Siu Siu), whom psychiatrists believe has been imprisoned, is unable to tell anyone who she is. However, she has a photo of Chan, who doesn't recognise her. Chan receives a phone call from the girl's captor and realises he has intentionally released the girl. The serial killer then arrives at Chan's apartment, kills three detectives, and captures and taunts Chan, but does not kill her. Despite not having seen his face, Chan is convinced from the encounter he works in the police department. Soon, Officer Cheung Chi-chuen (Chan Wing-fai) is arrested, and the girl identifies him in a lineup. Before trial, Cheung is stabbed to death by the father of one of the victims.

The case is now closed, and the girl, having been identified as Cheung Sze-mei, reunites with her parents who lost her 12 years ago. Officer Wong Wing-nin (Tse Kwan-ho) of the Public Relation Bureau arrives at Chan's apartment to celebrate. Chan and Wong make love after a few drinks. While Wong is in the shower, Chan accidentally picks up his phone, and hears the voice of "Cheung Sze-mei". At the same time, Chan's assistant (Cheung Tat-ming) discovers it was Wong who many years ago secured Lee's release - and realizes that Wong is the killer.

Cast
 Kathy Chow as Joyce Chan Ching-yee
 Tse Kwan-ho as Wong Wing-nin
 Cheung Tat-ming as Chan's assistant
 Sam Lee as Lee Chun-min
 Siu Siu as the little girl

External links

1998 crime drama films
1998 crime thriller films
1998 horror films
1998 films
Hong Kong crime thriller films
Hong Kong serial killer films
Police detective films
Films shot in Hong Kong
Films set in Hong Kong
Films directed by Alan Mak
1998 directorial debut films
Crime horror films
Hong Kong psychological horror films
1998 drama films
1990s Hong Kong films
1990s Cantonese-language films